Rianne Guichelaar (born 16 August 1983 in Enschede) is a water polo player of the Netherlands who represents the Dutch national team in international competitions.

Guichelaar was part of the team that became fifth at the 2001 Women's European Water Polo Championship in Budapest. They became 9th at the 2001 FINA Women's World Water Polo Championship in Fukuoka and sixth at the 2003 World Aquatics Championships in Barcelona. The Dutch team failed to qualify for the 2004 Summer Olympics and finished 10th at the 2005 World Aquatics Championships in Montreal. At the 2006 FINA Women's Water Polo World League in Cosenza and the 2006 Women's European Water Polo Championship in Belgrade they finished in fifth place, followed by the 9th spot at the 2007 World Aquatics Championships in Melbourne. The Dutch team finished in fifth place at the 2008 Women's European Water Polo Championship in Málaga and they qualified for the 2008 Summer Olympics in Beijing. There they ended up winning the gold medal on 21 August, beating the United States 9-8 in the final.

See also
 Netherlands women's Olympic water polo team records and statistics
 List of Olympic champions in women's water polo
 List of Olympic medalists in water polo (women)
 List of World Aquatics Championships medalists in water polo

References

External links
 

1983 births
Living people
Sportspeople from Enschede
Dutch female water polo players
Water polo drivers
Left-handed water polo players
Water polo players at the 2008 Summer Olympics
Medalists at the 2008 Summer Olympics
Olympic gold medalists for the Netherlands in water polo